Ortholeptura is a genus of beetles in the family Cerambycidae, containing the following species:

 Ortholeptura insignis (Fall, 1907)
 Ortholeptura obscura (Swaine & Hopping, 1928)
 Ortholeptura valida (LeConte, 1857)

References

Lepturinae